The 1945 Cornell Big Red football team was an American football team that represented Cornell University as an independent during the 1945 college football season. In its first season under head coach Edward McKeever, the team compiled a 5–4 record and outscored its opponents 169 to 166. Allen Dekdebrun was the team captain. 

Cornell played its home games at Schoellkopf Field in Ithaca, New York.

Schedule

References

Cornell
Cornell Big Red football seasons
Cornell Big Red football